Sriperumbudur Lok Sabha constituency is one of the  parliamentary constituencies in Tamil Nadu. Its Tamil Nadu Parliamentary Constituency number is 5 of 39. It has a very huge volume of voters with nearly twenty four lakhs.

Assembly segments

2009–present

Before 2009
Gummidipundi (moved to Thiruvallur constituency after 2009)
Ponneri (SC) (moved to Thiruvallur constituency after 2009)
Sriperumbudur
Poonamallee (moved to Thiruvallur constituency after 2009)
Tiruvallur (moved to Thiruvallur constituency after 2009)
Tiruttani (moved to Arakkonam constituency after 2009)

Members of the Parliament

Election results

General Election 2019

General Election 2014

General Election 2009

General Election 2004

See also
 Sriperumbudur
 List of Constituencies of the Lok Sabha

References

 http://164.100.24.209/newls/lokaralpha.aspx?lsno=13

External links
Sriperumbudur lok sabha  constituency election 2019 date and schedule

Lok Sabha constituencies in Tamil Nadu
Kanchipuram district